Sorbus vexans (known as bloody whitebeam) is a rare tree in the family Rosaceae. It is endemic to England.  It is found along the coast between Culbone in Somerset and an area just west of Trentishoe in Devon. It can be seen in the Exmoor National Park.  It is threatened by habitat loss.

Description
Sorbus vexans is a small tree or shrub, often with multiple stems. The leaves, greyish-white below like other whitebeams, are narrower than most other species in this genus. The fruits, which develop from September on, are deep red.

References

Endemic flora of England
vexans
Vulnerable plants
Environment of Somerset
Exmoor
Environment of Devon
Taxonomy articles created by Polbot